Tourism in Sri Lanka is growing rapidly. For centuries, Sri Lanka has been a popular place of attraction for foreign travelers. The Chinese traveler Fa-Hien visited Sri Lanka as early as the 410's AD/CE, and in the twelfth century, Italian explorer Marco Polo claimed Sri Lanka to be the "best island of its size in the world".

Tourism

The government initiatives in the development of tourism date back to 1937 when the Ceylon Tourist Bureau was established.  However, it was closed down in September 1939 due to World War II. After Sri Lanka's independence the promotion of tourism was again considered by re-establishing the Ceylon Tourist Board which took over the function of the Tourist Bureau.

In 1965, J. R. Jayewardene as Minister of State initiated the first major development of the tourism industry with the Ceylon Tourist Board Act No 10 of 1966 and the Ceylon Hotels Corporation Act No 14 of 1966, which formed the Ceylon Tourist Board and the Ceylon Hotels Corporation. Since then the Ceylon Tourist Board has functioned as the state agency, responsible for the development and promotion of the tourism sector in Sri Lanka. Ceylon Hotels Corporation paved the way for government investments to build hotels needed to attract tourists.

In October 2007 according to Section 2 of the Tourism Act No. 38 of 2005, the Sri Lanka Tourist Board (Act No 10 of 1966) was replaced by the Sri Lanka Tourism Development Authority (SLTDA).

Currently, Sri Lanka Tourism Development Authority has classified Sri Lanka into several resort regions suitable for tourism development.

 Colombo and Greater Colombo Resort Region: The Colombo and Greater Colombo Resort Region spreads along the Mount Lavinia in the south to Negombo in the north. Colombo city is the main part of the zone and is the centre for business activities, conferences and sports events in the country. Colombo serves as both a gateway and a stopover point for international tourists. 
 South Coast Resort Region: The south coast zone extends from Wadduwa to Tissamaharama. The zone has been divided into two main regions. The first region extends from Wadduwa to Galle. Coastal areas like Kalutara, Beruwala, Bentota, Dedduwa, Madu Ganga, Balapitiya, Ahungalla, and Hikkaduwa are included in this region. The second region, extending from Galle to Tissamaharama, includes Unawatuna, Koggala, Weligama, Mirissa, Matara, Tangalle and Hambantota areas as sub-points of the zone. 
 East Coast Resort Region: The East Coast Resort Region extends from Kuchchaveli in the north to Pottuvil in the south. The main tourism zones in this region are Arugam Bay, Pasikudah, Trincomalee and Nilaveli.
 West Coast Resort Region: The West Coast Resort Region extends along Kalpitiya, Marawila and Waikkala areas.  
 High Country Resort Region: Nuwara Eliya, Bandarawela and Maskeliya are included for the High Country Resort Region.
 Ancient Cities Resort Region: This region has five world heritage sites, namely Anuradhapura, Dambulla, Kandy, Polonnaruwa and Sigiriya. Other regions include Habarana, Giritale, Matale and Victoria.
 Other Resort Regions: This includes Yala, Udawalawa, Wasgamuwa, Pinnawala, and Ratnapura, Knuckles Range area.

Shared Tourism with India
 
In the past, ferry services between India and Sri Lanka for tourists have been introduced and suspended repeatedly because of their low usage. The low usage of the old ferry services could be due to the high cost of the former services. As of now, the only way for tourists to access India from Sri Lanka is by air. In 2019 negotiations about ferry services between Colombo and Tuticorin and between Talaimannar and Rameshwaram began. There is also a proposal to operate a cruise/ferry service between Colombo and Kochi in Kerala. The Indian and Sri Lankan governments are working closely together to connect the two neighbouring countries better. The Sri Lankan minister of Tourism Development John Amaratunga indicated that ferry service will help tourists from both sides to travel at a very low cost.

History

When the government decided to develop the tourism sector as a separate sector of the country's economy by establishing the Ceylon Tourist Bureau in 1966, there were 18,969 foreign tourist arrivals in Sri Lanka. There was an upward trend of tourist arrivals until 1982, with the exception of 1971. Between 1976 and 1982, tourist arrivals had increased by 24% per year. The tourist traffic in 1982 showed that there was a remarkable growth in the number of tourists, with 407,230 arrivals. However, with the beginning of the civil war in 1983, the growth of tourist arrivals declined and stagnated to around 300,000 – 500,000 arrivals annually.

The civil war that had lasted over 25 years ended in 2009 as LTTE separatists were defeated by government forces. In 2009 the tourist arrivals numbered 448,000, and in 2015, 1,798,380, showing over 300 percent growth in six years.

There is a significant domestic tourist segment making excursions in Sri Lanka. In 2014 six million Sri Lankans travelled within the country as domestic tourists. The main purposes of travel by the domestic tourists are pilgrimage, family holiday, study works, and sightseeing. The main destinations of domestic tourists are Anuradhapura, Kataragama, Nuwara Eliya, Kandy, Sri Pada, Polonnaruwa, Sigiriya and Dambulla. Domestic tourism is noticeable during school vacations and on weekends.

Sri Lanka saw a massive slump in tourists in the wake of the terrorist bombings. Authorities say there was a 70% drop in tourists after the 2019 Sri Lanka Easter bombings, but the tourism industry witnessed a modest revival afterwards.

Sri Lanka’s tourist arrivals fell by 70.8% from a year earlier to 71,370 in March 2020, amid the COVID-19 crisis, the data released by the  Sri Lanka Tourism Development Authority (SLTDA) showed. March marked the third consecutive month of dropping in tourist arrivals. In January, arrivals fell by 6.5% to 228,434 and in February arrivals dropped by 17.7% to 207,507. Since April 2019, following the Easter Sunday terror attacks, Sri Lanka has witnessed a monthly decline in tourist arrivals year-on-year in comparison to 2018 and 2019. Sri Lanka tightened tourist arrivals from mid-March and suspended all passenger arrivals from all countries on March 19 in order to contain the spread of the COVID-19 pandemic. In 2020, the largest source market for tourists was India, followed by the Russian Federation and the United Kingdom. Almost 98% of tourists travelled by air to Sri Lanka. Europe became the largest source of tourist traffic to Sri Lanka with 60% of the total traffic received in March 2020. Asia and Pacific accounted for 34% of the total traffic, the Americas 4.6%, the Middle East 0.9% and Africa 0.5%. In comparison to March last year the highest decline of 85.7% was recorded for the Middle East region while the Americas recorded a decline of 83.4%. Africa recorded a decline of 77.9% whereas Asia and Pacific recorded a decline of 75.4%. A decline of 64.3% was recorded from Europe. The effect of the outbreak of COVID-19 is clearly evident as all countries have recorded a decline in arrivals. However, it is noteworthy that arrivals from Kazakhstan have recorded an increase of 79.7%. It is noteworthy that China which dropped from the top ten tourist-generating markets of Sri Lanka in the month of February has climbed up to the ninth position among the top ten markets despite the outbreak of COVID-19.

Sri Lanka reopened for tourism in January 2021 under a health protocol involving pre-flight and post-arrival tests for Coronavirus. Tourists could visit a series of designated locations under 'bio bubble' concept avoiding contact with locals and stay at a number of certified hotels. An updated list is made available at the Sri Lanka Tourism promotion authority website section called 'Hello Again' helloagain. Prior to the official opening, a controversy erupted over tourists brought from Ukraine by a former Ambassador to Russia, where health protocols were breached. It was later described as a pilot project. The first tourists after the Covid-19 closure arrived in Ukraine's SkyUp Airlines at Mattala Airport on December 28 as part of the so-called pilot project. In January and February 2021 Sri Lanka welcomed 5,048 tourists, down from 435,941 in 2020, before airports closed in March.

Attractions
Tourist attractions are classifiable as natural or anthropogenic. Natural attractions include nature spots, flora and fauna, and places with a pleasant climate. Geotourism sites may also be included in this category. Anthropogenic attractions include archaeological and cultural attractions, historical and religion sites, performing arts and folklore, handicrafts and artifacts.

Wildlife 

Despite its small size, Sri Lanka possesses a high level of biodiversity and wildlife resources and is rated among the 34 biodiversity hotspots in the world. Many species of flora and fauna are indigenous to Sri Lanka. This has made the island a country with the highest rates of biological endemism in the world.

Forbes ranked Sri Lanka as one of top top wildlife safaris outside of Africa, due to the actual presence of five charismatic megafauna (The Big Five) and the relative ease of seeing them during a single tour itinerary. The Leopard, the Asian elephant and Sloth Bear are found in several national parks. The Yala National Park has one of the highest concentrations of leopards in the world. Wildlife photographer and author Gehan de Silva  Wijeyeratne has shown that Sri Lanka is the best place in the world to spot Blue whales. A narrow continental shelf off Mirissa, Sri Lanka allows Blue and Sperm whales to swim close to the shore. Seasonally, the largest gathering of Asian elephants numbering 200-300 or higher takes place at the Minneriya National Park.

Approximately 7% of the area is national parks, the areas allowed for the public to see and study wildlife. Sri Lanka's national parks have become popular tourist destinations.

Beaches

Sri Lanka possesses nearly  coastlines with tropical beaches which are popular among both local and foreign tourists. Most of the coastlines of the country are studded with varying coastal features such as bays, lagoons, sandbanks, and rocky headlands. Marine recreation activities, such as sea bathing and swimming, surfing, boating, snorkelling, deep-sea fishing, underwater photography, and scuba diving, can be seen at most of these beaches and related resort areas. Beaches at Tangalle, Beruwala, Mirissa, Bentota, Unawatuna Arugam Bay, Pasikudah, Hikkaduwa, Uppuveli and Negombo are considered as famous tourist beaches in the country. Coconut Tree Hill is a popular tourist attraction in Mirissa beach and one of the most Instagrammed locations in Sri Lanka.

Natural scenic beauty 
Sri Lanka has numerous tourist attractions with areas of natural scenic beauty, primarily including mountainous terrains, agricultural landscapes, waterfalls, places with diverse climatic conditions, reservoirs (wewas), and rivers.

Botanical/zoological gardens

The country has six botanical gardens and four Zoological gardens. The botanical gardens are maintained by the Department of National Botanical Gardens, and the zoological gardens are maintained by the Department of National Zoological Gardens. The gardens have become attractive places among local and foreign visitors.

Bird Watching
Sri Lanka is home to 26 endemic-bird species and seven proposed endemic species. The total number of bird species recorded in the island is 492 of which 219 are breeding residents. Field Ornithology Group of Sri Lanka, commonly abbreviated FOGSL, is the Sri Lankan affiliate of BirdLife International. It was founded in 1976 to promote the conservation of birds and preservation of the environment. FOGSL headquarters are situated in the Department of Zoology, University of Colombo, Sri Lanka. Identifying and proposing Important Bird Areas (IBAs) in Sri Lanka is one of the main activities of the group. From 2008, Field Ornithology Group conducts a bird count in December in the lines of Christmas Bird Count by the National Audubon Society of the United States. Sri Lanka's location at the tip of the Indian subcontinent has made the island a termination point in the North-South bird migratory route.

The small grants programme of the United Nations Development Programme granted the Field Ornithology Group 20,308.00 for printing of selected publications and other activities. As part of their educational programmes, Field Ornithology Group has published many books and posters, not only on birds but also mammals and wetlands. The FOGSL also publish two periodicals, Kedetta in Sinhala and Malkoha in English.

Heritage

Heritage tourism involves visiting historical sites. Sri Lanka is very rich in pre-historic, proto-historic, and historic monuments, which bespeak its ancient civilization and culture. Mainly Buddhism has influenced in the moulding of the cultural heritage of the country. The historic period of Sri Lanka proper starts circa 236 B.C. with the introduction of Buddhism to the country by the missionaries sent by the Indian empire Asoka.

The UNESCO has declared six archaeological and two ecological World Heritage Sites in the country. Beside the world heritage sites the government of Sri Lanka has declared a number of archaeological protected sites and monuments within the country.

Pilgrimage

Sri Lanka is well known for its rich Buddhist culture as well as other religions. Being a religious country, Sri Lanka has many places with religious and historic significance, which attract tourists from all over the world. Anuradhapura, Temple of the Tooth, Adam's Peak, Shrine of Our Lady of Madhu and Kataragama, are a few famous religious sites in the island that attract a large number of tourists.

The foot pilgrimage called Pada Yatra, which is one of Sri Lanka's oldest traditions, has been practiced for centuries, where the local people from Jaffna come along the East Coast to Kataragama shrine.

Sports and adventure
Sports tourism is defined as either people being involved in, observing or participating in a particular sporting event for leisure.  Sri Lanka is also a destination for sports such as cricket, rugby, golf and surfing. Except for cricket, the contribution to the tourism sector from other sports is still at a very low level. Apart from mainstream sports events, adventure sports are also included in sports tourism. Trekking, hiking, diving, rock climbing, deep sea fishing, whale watching, kitesurfing and hot air ballooning are some of the adventure sports those can be found in Sri Lanka.

Culture and other

Cultural tourism includes tourism in urban areas, particularly historic or large cities and their cultural facilities such as museums and theatres.

Museums and theatres – Currently four national museums  and 26 archaeological museums have been established in Sri Lanka. National museums are maintained by the Department of National Museums and archaeological museums by the Department of Archaeology. Besides the museums, a large number of theatres also can be found in Sri Lanka.

Festivals – Sri Lanka is a multi-cultural country with several different festivals celebrated by various communities. The Kandy Esala Perahera, Sinhala and Tamil New Year celebrations, Vesak Festival, Christmas, Ramadan festival, Thai Pongal, and the Galle Literary Festival are a few of the major festivals.

Performing arts – There are three main traditional dance forms in Sri Lanka: Kandyan dancing, low country dancing, and Sabaragamuwa dancing. Though not unique to Sri Lanka, 'Bharatanatyam', which originated from India is also popular in Sri Lanka, particularly among the Tamil community.

Food – The cuisine of Sri Lanka has been influenced by many historical, cultural, and other factors. Rice is the main staple diet of the country. Other staples include hoppers, string hoppers, and pittu.

Being one of the largest producers of tea in the world Sri Lanka is best known for the production of unorthodox tea. Tea was introduced to the country by the British who called the country "Ceylon". Pure Ceylon tea is considered some of the finest tea produced anywhere in the world.

Handicrafts – Handicrafts available in Sri Lanka include wood carving, silverware, brass castings, ceramic ware, bamboo products, pottery, batiks, lace works, cane works, costume jewellery, lacquerware, wooden masks, coir goods, handlooms, and ivory products.

Accommodations 

Tourist accommodations in Sri Lanka consist of graded hotels, supplementary establishments, guest houses and limited scale camping sites. More informal accommodation is available on a paying guest system in private houses and hill-country tea estate bungalows.

Earnings
The tourist industry makes a significant contribution to the national economy by directly contributing to the government budget, foreign-exchange earnings and employment generation. It contributes both directly and indirectly, in the provision of goods and services to the tourist sector.

Social and environmental impacts
Tourism in Sri Lanka, despite its generate Income to the economy, It had received some critics. Some endangered animal species seem to be seriously threatened by the rise of tourism in some areas; that is the case with the Keerthisinghe’s Rock Frog, which is endemic in Sri Lanka.

An alternative kind of tourism, called ecotourism, sustainable tourism or responsible tourism, enables travellers to participate in tourism throughout Sri Lanka while contributing to the well-being of the local communities and making sure their environmental impact is limited. The Sri Lanka Ecotourism Foundation is the national organization that created an official ecotourism network through the island, allowing to develop sustainable tourism with wide options of travel. In 2010, the foundation won the presidential award for "Outstanding Contribution for Tourism in Sri Lanka".

See also

 Economy of Sri Lanka
 Travel and Tourism Competitiveness Report
 Visa policy of Sri Lanka

 World Tourism Organization
 World Travel Monitor

References

External links

 Sri Lanka Tourism Development Authority

 
Sri Lanka